Marie Costine (born in Cloyne County Cork) is a former camogie player selected on the camogie team of the century in 2004, and winner of All Ireland medals in 1970, 1971, 1972, 1973 (as captain) and 1978.

Career
Costine played club camogie with both Killeagh and Imokilly, winning ten Cork County Championships and an All Ireland Club Championship in 1980, when Killeagh defeated the Buffers Alley side. She was the first Cloyne girl to bring an All Ireland to Cloyne, home of the great Christy Ring. She contributed significantly to the success of a Cork team that won four championships in a row and added another All Ireland in 1978. She captained the Rebels in 1973. That same year she was chosen Player of the Year.

Awards
In 1973, she won the camogie player of the year.

Citation
Her team of the century citation read: "possessing superb ball control, composed and confidant, she revelled in catching and clearing, She was at her best under pressure and made life difficult for forwards through skill and determination. A superb full-back, on her day she could keep any forward at bay."

GAA Family
Her sister Kathleen won three All Ireland medals as goalkeeper for Cork. Her nephew Donal Óg Cusack was a noted Cork hurling goalkeeper.

References

Cork camogie players
Living people
Year of birth missing (living people)